Tan Cerca...Tan Lejos (So close ... so far) is the title of the studio album released by Mexican singer José José in 1975. The main hits of the album were: Candilejas (Charles Chaplin's Terry's Theme), Sentimientos (Morris Albert's Feelings), Nuestros Recuerdos (The Way We Were), Paloma 'Cada Mañana Que Te Vas''' (theme of the soap opera 'Paloma') and Divina ilusión'' (an adaptation of Étude Op. 10, No. 3 of Chopin).

Track listing
 Divina Ilusión (adaptation of Étude Op. 10, No. 3 of Chopin)
 Sentimientos (Feelings)
 Nuestros Recuerdos (The Way We Were)
 Tan Cerca...Tan Lejos
 Hoy Vuelvo A Ser...El Triste
 Paloma 'Cada Mañana Que Te Vas'
 Candilejas (The Terry Theme)
 Porque Yo No Soy Poeta
 Tú Y Yo
 Alas

1975 albums
José José albums
Spanish-language albums